The Taipei Gymnasium is a gymnasium in Songshan District, Taipei, Taiwan.

History
The gymnasium was opened in 1994 and renovated in 2008.

Architecture
The gymnasium is housed in a 7-story building with a total floor area of 5,128 m2. It consists of facilities and equipment for ball games, conference room, audio center, classrooms for martial arts and aerobic, offices, badminton and billiard room. Ball games area has 1,340 seating capacity and badminton area has 1,000 seating capacity. The building also consists of two basement floors.

Sporting events
Several major sporting events had been fully or partially held in Taipei Gymnasium, such as:
 2006 Taipei International Invitational Futsal Tournament
 2009 Summer Deaflympics
 2014 Taipei City International Boxing Tournament
 2014 William Jones Cup

Transport
The gymnasium is accessible from Taipei Arena Station of the Taipei Metro.

See also
 Sports in Taiwan

References

1994 establishments in Taiwan
Indoor arenas in Taiwan
Badminton in Taiwan
Badminton venues
Sports venues completed in 1994
Sports venues in Taipei